D-Formation is the fifth full-length studio album by J-pop singer Minori Chihara. It was released on February 29, 2012.

Track listing

Minori Chihara albums
2012 albums
Lantis (company) albums